Southey may refer to:

Places
 Sotby, Lincolnshire, England, called "Southey" in the Domesday Book of William the Conqueror
 Southey, South Yorkshire, England
 Southey, Saskatchewan

Surname
 Caroline Anne Southey (1786–1854), English poet; second wife of Robert Southey
 Richard Southey (colonial administrator) (1808–1901), South African colonial administrator and cabinet minister; father of Col. Richard Southey
 Richard Southey (British Army officer) (1844–1909), South African colonial military commander; son of Sir Richard Southey
 Reginald Southey (1835–1899), English physician; nephew of Robert Southey
 Robert Southey (1774–1843), English romantic poet

See also
Southie (disambiguation)
South (disambiguation)